Sophie Adriansen (1982, Orléans) is a French writer, a member of the Société des gens de lettres and of the "Charte des auteurs et des illustrateurs jeunesse".

Works

Novels 
2016: Le Syndrome de la vitre étoilée, Paris,
2013: 
2012: 
2012:

Nonfiction 
2016: , with 
2014: 
2013: , with Sandra Dal-Maso
2013: 
2012: , with Jean-Paul Rouet
2010: , with Rodolphe Macia

Youth literature 
2016: Les Grandes jambes, Slalom, 128 p. 
2015: Max et les poissons, Paris, 96 p.
2015: Drôles d'époques !, Nathan, hors série series "L’Énigme des vacances" n°42, 192 p.
2015: Musiques diaboliques (Scooby-Doo), Nathan, series "L’Énigme des vacances" n°45, 96 p. 
2015: La menace des fantômes (Scooby-Doo), Nathan, series "L’Énigme des vacances" n°44, 96 p. 
2015: L'attaque des monstres animaux (Scooby-Doo), Nathan, series "L’Énigme des vacances" n°43, 96 p.
2014: Drôles de familles !, Nathan, hors série series "L’Énigme des vacances" n°37, 192 p.
2013:  
2012:

Short stories

Collective collections 
2013: Première loge in Les aventures du concierge masqué -  saison 3, L'Exquise Édition, 260 p.
2012: Sophie et Antonin in Les plus belles rencontres sur Facebook, Trinôme Éditions, 169 p.
2012: Seules les mères et les chanteuses de pop in Temps additionnel, Éditions Antidata, 169 p.
2011: Santé ! in Six façons de le dire, with David Foenkinos, Mercedes Deambrosis, Nicolas d'Estienne d'Orves, Yasmina Khadra, Éditions du Moteur, 224 p.
 Rendez-vous manqué (coup de cœur des libraires) in Rendez-vous, Éditions du Valhermeil

Literary magazines 
2012: Frapper fort in  n°6 [Foot], Stéphane Million éditeur
2012: Des adieux éphémères (cadavre exquis) in l’Ampoule n°3 [Gloire et oubli], Éditions de l’Abat-jour
2012: Jour de chance in Bordel n°15 [Made in China], Stéphane Million éditeur
2011: Dans le noir in Pr'Ose n°17 [Une île]
2011: Troisième visite in Dissonances n°20 [Maman]

References

External links 
 Site personnel
 Blog littéraire
 Sophie Adriansen on Les Incorruptibles
 Sophie Adriansen on La Cause littéraire

21st-century French novelists
French children's writers
21st-century French women writers
French women children's writers
Writers from Orléans
1982 births
Living people